Dracula is a film series of horror films from Universal Pictures based on the 1897 novel Dracula by Bram Stoker and its 1927 play adaptation. The series is a loose collection of films, with historians stating that the films all reference characters, events or at least passing knowledge of the 1931 English-language production of Dracula, with historians noting that  Dracula's Daughter and Son of Dracula are more closely related to the 1931 film while the character of Dracula would make smaller appearances in later films such as House of Frankenstein and House of Dracula. After Dracula's Daughter, the character of Dracula and other vampires in the series became more Americanized starting with the release of Son of Dracula, and the later House of films. The character of Dracula appears in all the films outside of Dracula's Daughter, where he is portrayed by Bela Lugosi (Dracula, Abbott and Costello Meet Frankenstein), Lon Chaney, Jr. (Son of Dracula), and John Carradine in the House of films.

Films
Film historians have described in different terms to what films belong to the series. Ken Hanke wrote in A Critical Guide to Horror Film Series stated that Universal produced only three films (Dracula, Dracula's Daughter, and Son of Dracula) "can properly be called part of a loosely grouped Dracula series" and that Son of Dracula, is really a distant cousin and that the films where Dracula appears were "token appearances" and were more incorporated into the Frankenstein series. Gary D. Rhodes wrote in his book Tod Browning's Dracula that Universal had produced five films in their classic era whose plotlines assume the audience would be familiar with the Count Dracula character from either viewing or being aware of the 1931 film. Hanke included both Dracula's Daughter and Son of Dracula. Rhodes noted that the later films that include Dracula such as House of Frankenstein and House of Dracula have the character portrayed differently, as a Southern gentleman with a moustache with only limited appearances in the films, such as his character only appearing for 15 minutes in House of Frankenstein. In both House of films, Dracula is quickly disposed leading the rest of films to deal with The Wolf Man and Frankenstein's monster. Carradine later spoke about his portrayal of Dracula in the two House of films to Fangoria magazine, stating that "when [Universal] asked me to play Dracula, I said yes, if you let me make him up and play him the way Bram Stoker described him - as an elderly, distinguished gentleman with a drooping mustache. [Universal] didn't like a big mustache, so I had to trim it and make it a very clopped, British mustache. It wasn't really in character". In House of Frankenstein, the skeleton of Count Dracula is found in Castle Dracula from the mountains of Transylvania. Count Dracula is never destroyed there in any of the previous three Universal Dracula films.

Count Dracula as portrayed by Bela Lugosi appears again in Universal's Abbott and Costello Meet Frankenstein where Rhodes described his character as less regal than the 1931 film, featuring a Count Dracula who is able to run, crash through a door, throw a flower pot, all of which would be inconceivable of the character in the 1931 film.

Dracula

Renfield is a solicitor traveling to Count Dracula's castle in Transylvania on a business matter. The local village people fear that vampires inhabit the castle and warn Renfield not to go there. Renfield enters the castle welcomed by the charming but eccentric Count, who, unbeknownst to Renfield, is a vampire. They discuss Dracula's intention to lease Carfax Abbey in London, where he intends to travel the next day. Dracula hypnotizes Renfield into opening a window, leaving open to an attack from Dracula.

After this, Renfield is found aboard the schooner Vesta, having become a raving lunatic slave to Dracula, who hides in a coffin and feeds on the ship's crew. Renfield is sent to Dr. Seward's sanatorium adjoining Carfax Abbey. At a London theatre, Dracula meets Seward. Seward introduces his daughter Mina, her fiancé John Harker, and the family friend Lucy Weston. Lucy is fascinated by Count Dracula. That night, Dracula enters her room and feasts on her blood while she sleeps. Lucy dies the next day after a string of transfusions. Professor Van Helsing analyzes Renfield's blood and discovers his obsession. Dracula visits Mina, asleep in her bedroom, and bites her. After a meeting with Dracula, Van Helsing finds that he casts no reflection in a mirror and deduces that Dracula is the vampire behind the recent tragedies. After several subsequent interactions, Dracula is hunted by Van Helsing and Harker, who know that Dracula is forced to sleep in his coffin during daylight, and the sun is rising. Van Helsing prepares a wooden stake while Harker searches for Mina. Van Helsing impales Dracula through the heart, killing him.

Dracula's Daughter

Dracula's Daughter begins a few moments after Dracula ends. Count Dracula has just been destroyed by Professor Von Helsing. Von Helsing is arrested by two Whitby policemen, Sergeant Wilkes and constable Albert. Von Helsing is sent by the Whitby police to Scotland Yard, where he explains to Sir Basil Humphrey that he indeed did destroy Count Dracula, but because he had already been dead for over 500 years, it cannot be considered murder. Instead of hiring a lawyer, he enlists the aid of a psychiatrist, Dr. Jeffrey Garth, who was once one of his star students. Sergeant Wilkes leaves the Whitby gaol to meet an officer from Scotland Yard at the train station. Meanwhile, Dracula's daughter, Countess Marya Zaleska, enters the gaol and mesmerizes Albert with her jeweled ring and with the aid of her manservant, Sandor, steals Dracula's body from the Whitby gaol and after tossing salt on the pyre ritualistically burns Dracula's body, hoping to break her curse of vampirism. However, Sandor soon begins to discourage her telling her that all that is in her eyes is "death". She soon gives in to her thirst for blood. The Countess resumes her hunting, mesmerizing her victims with her exotic jeweled ring. After a chance meeting with Dr. Garth at a society party, the Countess asks him to help her overcome the influence she feels from beyond the grave. The doctor advises her to defeat her cravings by confronting them.

The Countess gives up fighting her urges and accepts that a cure is not possible; she lures Dr. Garth to Transylvania by kidnapping Janet Blake, his secretary, whom he has a playfully antagonistic relationship with, but now realizes that he cares for her. Zaleska intends to transform Dr. Garth into a vampire to be her eternal companion. Arriving at Castle Dracula in Transylvania, Dr. Garth agrees to exchange his life for Janet's. Before he can be transformed, Countess Zaleska is destroyed when Sandor shoots her through the heart with an arrow as revenge for her breaking her promise to make him immortal. He takes aim at Dr. Garth but is shot dead by a Scotland Yard policeman who, along with Von Helsing, have followed Dr. Garth from London.

Son of Dracula

The film is set in the United States, where Count Alucard has just taken up residence. Katherine Caldwell, a student of the occult, becomes fascinated by Alucard and eventually marries him. Katherine begins to look and act strangely leading to her former romantic partner Frank Stanley (Robert Paige) to suspect that something has happened to her. He gets help from Dr. Brewster, (Frank Craven) and psychologist Laszlo (J. Edward Bromberg) who come to the conclusion that Alucard is a vampire.

Production
The 1931 English-language Dracula film is based on both the novel by Bram Stoker and the 1927 stage play by Hamilton Deane and John L. Balderston.
Universal Pictures had followed the success of the play in London, and bought the rights to the book and play in June 1930 for $40,000. Lon Chaney, Sr. was the initial choice for the title role, but he was suffering from bronchial cancer and died a month before production commenced on Dracula. Other candidates for the title role included Paul Muni, Ian Keith, William Courtenay, Joseph Schildkraut, Chester Morris and Conrad Veidt. Bela Lugosi, who had performed as Dracula on stage, was cast. On February 12, 1931, Dracula premiered. Following its release, Dracula earned Universal $700,000 domestically, almost double its production cost.

After looking at several screenplays and ideas for a sequel, Universal's earliest development on what would become Dracula's Daughter was in 1934 when MGM executive producer David O. Selznick arrived from RKO thinking of developing his own vampire film. Selznick had purchased the rights to Dracula's Guest, a short story by Stoker, and then commissioned a script from Universal writer John L. Balderson as a sequel to Dracula. The development of this film led to many legal difficulties as, legally, the treatment couldn't be filmed by any studio except Universal since it was too close to their 1931 film, which led to Selznick selling off the rights to the story to Universal in September 1934, on the condition that the film be in production by October 1935. This date would be extended several times. The film was initially going to be directed by A. Edward Sutherland, but was eventually directed by Lambert Hillyer. Production finally began on February 4, 1936, just in time to meet the final deadline granted by Selznick. Its final budget became $278,000, which was among the highest for a Universal horror film. It was released on May 11, 1936.

The authors of the book Universal Horrors noted that the studio was "oddly hesitant" to resurrect Dracula, after enthusiastically releasing sequels to Frankenstein, The Mummy and The Invisible Man.  Son of Dracula was prepared under different standards at Universal than the previous two films. The company had only restarted production on horror films in 1938 with the film Son of Frankenstein (1939) and Universal's Chairman of the Board J. Cheever Cowdin had been heavily involved in the formation of the company.  Profits at Universal by 1941 has been higher than they had been in 1940 while a double bill of both Dracula and Frankenstein (1931) in early 1942 was declared to have "staggeringly good business" in the Motion Picture Herald. Following these events, the Daily Variety announced on June 5 that two new horror films were announced with Lon Chaney, Jr.: Frankenstein Meets the Wolf Man (1943) and Son of Dracula. Son of Dracula was released on October 20, 1943. Tom Weaver wrote in 2019 that Son of Dracula took place outside the universe of Dracula (1931) and Dracula's Daughter (1936). Weaver noted that in Son of Dracula, Prof. Lazlo states that Count Dracula was destroyed in the 19th century making it not follow the story of the two previously mentioned films. Weaver also highlighted a pressbook article that stated that "although Son of Dracula is not a 'continuation' of [the 1931 Dracula], it is based mainly on the same ghoulish legend of the vampire...."

Undeveloped films
Within three weeks of the release of Dracula, Universal considered no fewer than three ideas for a sequel. These included the following titles submitted to the Hayes Office: The Modern Dracula, The Return of Dracula and The Son of Dracula. None of these films were produced and no information on their potential plot lines is available.

In 1939, Lugosi's friend Manly P. Hall wrote a treatment for an unmade sequel to Dracula that would follow-up after the end of the 1931 film. This film involved Dracula returning to life as Van Helsing had staked the vampire one minute after sundown, an event that would rework the event of the original film. In 1949, Universal discussed the idea of a remake of Dracula with Lugosi with an industry press claiming the deal was in "negotiation stages". Prior to the release of House of Dracula, an April 1944 Hollywood trade paper announced a film titled Wolfman vs. Dracula that would have been directed and produced by Ford Beebe.

Cast and crew
Dracula's Daughter featured more of the original crew of the first film than any subsequent sequel. This included John L. Balderston of the Deane-Balderston team who co-authored the 1927 Broadway play of Dracula, Garrett Fort, co-author of the final shooting script to Dracula, and E. M. "efe" Asher, who was the associate producer on the 1931 film. Universal originally planned to have Lugosi reprise his role in Dracula's Daughter, the final script did not feature his character outside a prop corpse. Dr. Seweard, Mina Seweard and Jonathan Harker do not appear in the sequel. Edward Van Sloan returned as Van Helsing, who is renamed Von Helsing in the film and features a darker hair, different eyeglasses and a different speaking style than he did in Dracula.

Crew

Reception
Dracula did not win any major film awards but received several critical accolades on its release. Motion Picture Herald included it in a list of the twenty films that received the greatest amount of exploitation during a six-month period ending on April 25, 1931. When asked to list the Ten Best Pictures of 1931, seventeen critics included Dracula. Retrospective critical analysis of Dracula, since the 1950s had often surrounded the film being "plodding", "stagebound" and "talkative".

The authors of Universal Horrors noted that Dracula's Daughter did not "quite place on the "first tier" of Universal horror classics", describing it as sharing the same orbit as films like Werewolf of London and Son of Frankenstein and that "there is nothing in Dracula's Daughter to equal the first reels of Dracula in terms of weaving an almost majestic sense of horror". The authors of Universal Horrors described Son of Dracula as being "lumped together" with Universal's output from the 1940s, with its reputation generally still lagging behind that of Dracula's Daughter with critics focusing on its erotic undertones over its technical merits. The authors summarized it as being considered a footnote as part of Robert Siodmak's career and a stepping stone to his more regarded film noir works.

See also
 Frankenstein (Universal film series)
 The Invisible Man (film series)
 The Mummy (franchise)
 The Wolf Man (franchise)

References

Citations

Sources
 
 
 
 
 
 
 
 

 
Film series introduced in 1931
Universal Pictures franchises